USS Guardian (MCM-5) was an  of the United States Navy, and was the second Navy ship to bear that name. The hulls of the Avenger-class ships were constructed of wood with an external coat of fiberglass.

Guardian was laid down on 8 May 1985 by Peterson Builders, Sturgeon Bay, Wisconsin; launched on 20 June 1987; and commissioned on 16 December 1989. In 2010, she became the first mine countermeasures vessel in the Seventh Fleet modified for a mixed-sex crew, with separate head facilities.

On 17 January 2013, Guardian ran aground on Tubbataha Reef, in a protected area of the Philippines in the middle of the Sulu Sea. The vessel was turned and pushed further onto the reef by wave action. Unable to be recovered, the vessel was decommissioned and struck from the US Naval Vessel Register on 15 February 2013. After removal of fuel and useful equipment, and after the upper superstructure was cut and lifted off of the minehunter, the wooden hull was sequentially chainsawed into four sections and lifted off of the reef by the dynamic positioning crane vessel MV Jascon 25. The bow section was cut and removed by crane on 26 March 2013. It was originally planned to cut the hull into three pieces, but the stern section had to be cut in half again. The last stern section was removed by crane from Tubbataha Reef on 30 March 2013.

History
In late November 2007, Guardian and sister minesweeper  tried refueling and seeking refuge from an approaching storm in Hong Kong's Victoria Harbour, but were denied entry without explanation by China. Both ships were eventually refueled at sea and returned safely to their homeports in Japan.

In February 2010, Guardian became the first mine countermeasures vessel in the Seventh Fleet to receive the Women-at-Sea modification, which was intended to allow the small vessel to accommodate a mixed-sex crew. The modification added no additional sleeping space, but did provide for separate head facilities for female crew members. However, with the exception of a very few officers, all mine countermeasures vessels in the Seventh Fleet were still manned by all-male crews at that time.

January 2013 grounding

On 17 January 2013, following a port call and fuel stop in Subic, Guardian proceeded across the Sulu Sea, and entered the Tubbataha Reefs Natural Park. About 90 minutes after the grounding, she was seen on park radar at approximately 04:00 hours local time. At the time of the accident, the ship was travelling from Subic Bay in the Philippines to Indonesia. The extent of any damage to the reef was unknown, but there was no evidence of fuel leaks. Philippines officials estimate the damage to the reef at 1,000 square meters. 

The second night aground the ship shifted and began taking heavy persistent seas to her port side. A petty officer navigated a tangle of machinery and pipes in the ship's bilge while it filled with water to construct shoring to reinforce the ship's hull, greatly slowing flooding and allowing the ship to maintain power. The sailor was awarded the Navy and Marine Corps Medal for his actions.

During the evacuation, another petty officer, one of two SAR swimmers aboard, saved the lives of two of his shipmates for which he was also later awarded the Navy and Marine Corps Medal. On 19 January 2013, an assessment team deployed to plan and execute the vessel's extraction. On 20 January 2013, Navy Times reported the ship was taking on water in multiple places and experiencing a slight list to port.

Originally, only the bow section of Guardian rested on the reef, but wave action pushed the entire vessel onto the reef,  from the edge. The guided missile destroyer , and salvage ship  arrived in the area to help in the intended extraction, as well as tugboats and Philippine Navy and Coast Guard vessels. It was intended for Guardian to be removed from the area by crane ships from Singapore, then be placed on a barge or other ship, since she was too damaged to be towed due to multiple hull penetrations. During the time the cranes traveled from Singapore to the Philippines, preparations were made for the lift. 15,000 gallons of fuel were transferred from the tanks in Guardian to other ships, then refilled with seawater to keep the vessel stable. Dry food stores and the personal effects of Guardians crew were removed as well. Salvage workers reinforced the wood-and-fiberglass hull of the minesweeper with Kevlar lines to mitigate stresses from waves hitting the vessel. Then, salvage workers from Mobile Diving and Salvage Unit One chopped the superstructure and wooden hull of the ship into multiple pieces.

On 29 January 2013, the US Navy announced the ship would be cut into three sections on the reef prior to removal, resulting in a total loss. Guardian was decommissioned and struck from the Naval Vessel Register on 15 February 2013. On 27 February 2013, salvage workers disassembled Guardian, a process estimated to take a month. The bridge deck was removed on 4 March 2013, and on 30 March 2013, the stern section of the ship was lifted off the reef, completing the removal process. In February 2013, Guardian was replaced with sister-ship  in the Seventh Fleet, with the crew of Warrior returning to San Diego, and the crew of Guardian taking over Warrior.

On 8 April 2013, the US Navy turned over digital navigation charts and other evidence, documents and data of Guardian to the Philippine Maritime Casualty Investigating Team (MCIT) and responded to "Technical and Substantive" queries. The MCIT conducted their own independent investigation and made recommendations for future navigation of the area. This chart was used by the crew of Guardian, and played a significant role in the grounding. Despite this, significant errors by the crew and commanding officers were also reported, including that they should have noted the inaccuracies in comparison to other charts.

On January 20, 2015, the United States government paid to the Philippine government a total of 87 million Philippine pesos, (or US$1.97 million). 59 million Philippine pesos for the reef damage and another 29 million pesos to reimburse services provided by the Philippine Coast Guard.

The US federal government apologized for the incident and relieved four officers: the Commanding Officer, the Executive Officer, and two junior officers: the Officer of the Deck, and the Assistant Navigator and Quartermaster of the Watch at the time of the mishap. 

The US government has acknowledged that the grounding was entirely preventable and caused by human error and a failure of leadership to provide adequate oversight and direction in planning and executing the Navigation Plan.

Chart error 
The National Geospatial-Intelligence Agency (NGA) admitted that the coastal scale Digital Nautical Chart (DNC) supplied to Guardian was flawed due to human error on the part of the NGA. NGA was aware of this error in 2011, and modified a smaller scale electronic chart. NGA failed to publish a correction for the larger scale chart that Guardian was using before the navigation officer ran the ship aground.

Awards
Navy Unit Commendation
Meritorious Unit Citation (2 awards)
Navy E Ribbon (6 awards)
Combat Action Ribbon
National Defense Service Medal with star
Southwest Asia Service Medal with one campaign star
Global War on Terrorism Service Medal

See also
2009 USS Port Royal grounding

References

External links 

navsource.org: USS Guardian

united-states-navy.com: USS Guardian
Video animation of the Removal

 

Avenger-class mine countermeasures ships
Minehunters of the United States
United States Navy in the 21st century
1987 ships
Ships built by Peterson Builders
Maritime incidents in 2013
2013 in the Philippines
Maritime incidents in the Philippines
Philippines–United States relations
International maritime incidents
Non-combat naval accidents